The 1957 NFL Championship Game was the 25th annual championship game, held on December 29 at Briggs Stadium in Detroit, Michigan.

The Detroit Lions (8–4), winners of the Western Conference, hosted the Cleveland Browns (9–2–1), champions of the Eastern Conference. Detroit had won the regular season game 20–7 three weeks earlier on December 8, also at Briggs Stadium, but lost quarterback Bobby Layne with a broken right ankle late in the first half. Reserve quarterback Tobin Rote, a starter the previous year with Green Bay, filled in for Layne and won that game with Cleveland, the next week at Chicago, and the tiebreaker playoff game at San Francisco.

It was the fourth pairing of the two teams in the championship game; they met previously in 1952, 1953, and 1954. The Browns, idle the previous week,  were favored by three points, but the home underdog Lions scored two touchdowns in each quarter and won in a rout, 59–14.

Until 2006, this was the last time that major professional teams from Michigan and Ohio met in a postseason game (or series) in any sport. As of 2022, this is the last NFL playoff game played in the city of Detroit other than Super Bowl XL in February 2006. The Lions' other two home playoff games since (1991 and 1993) were at the Silverdome in suburban Pontiac. This also remains as the Lions' fourth and most recent league title and most recent championship appearance (including the Super Bowl) as of the 2022 season, starting a sixty-six year championship drought for the Lions.

Starting lineups

Players in the Hall of Fame
Of those listed above, Lions' QB Bobby Layne was injured earlier in the month and did not play, and future Green Bay Packers defensive tackle Henry Jordan was a rookie for the Browns.

Game summary
The home underdog Lions were without starting quarterback Layne due to a broken ankle three weeks earlier against the Browns. Backup quarterback Tobin Rote filled in admirably following Layne's injury, winning every game, including a 24-point rally in the tiebreaker playoff over the 49ers the previous week. In his eighth season, Rote threw four touchdown passes in the title game, completing 12 of 19 passes for 280 yards, and also ran for a touchdown. Browns quarterbacks Tommy O'Connell and Milt Plum, on the other hand hit on a combined total of 9 of 22 passes for 112 yards. Taking full advantage of a pass interception and a fumble, Detroit ran up a 17–0 lead in the first quarter. Rookie running back Jim Brown gave the Cleveland rooters some hope with a 29-yard touchdown run at the start of the second period.

Things went from bad to worse for the Browns, hampered by injuries to quarterbacks O'Connell and Plum. The Lions romped for 14 points in each of the last three quarters,
and won by 45 points, 59–14.  In their final six quarters of play (including their previous divisional playoff), the Lions outscored their opponents 83-17.

Scoring summary
Sunday, December 29, 1957
Kickoff: 2:00 p.m. EST

First quarter
DET – FG Jim Martin, 31 yards, 3–0 DET
DET – Tobin Rote 1-yard run (Martin kick), 10–0 DET
DET – Gene Gedman 1-yard run (Martin kick), 17–0 DET
Second quarter
CLE – Jim Brown 29-yard run (Lou Groza kick), 17–7 DET
DET – Steve Junker 26-yard pass from Rote (Martin kick), 24–7 DET
DET – Terry Barr 19-yard interception (Martin kick), 31–7 DET
Third quarter
CLE – Lew Carpenter 5-yard run (Groza kick), 31–14 DET
DET – Jim Doran 78-yard pass from Rote (Martin kick), 38–14 DET
DET – Junker 23-yard pass from Rote (Martin kick), 45–14 DET
Fourth quarter
DET – Dave Middleton 32-yard pass from Rote (Martin kick), 52–14 DET
DET – Howard Cassady 17-yard pass from Jerry Reichow (Martin kick), 59–14 DET

Officials

Referee: Ron Gibbs
Umpire: Joe Connell
Head Linesman: Dan Tehan
Back Judge: Cleo Diehl
Field Judge: Don Looney 

Alternate: George Rennix
Alternate: James Beiersdorfer 
Alternate: Charlie Berry
Alternate: Chuck Sweeney

Players' shares
The gross receipts for the game, including radio and television rights, were just under $594,000, the highest to date. Each player on the winning Lions team received $4,295, while Browns players made $2,750 each.

Lions' last title
The Lions have not appeared in an NFL championship game (including the Super Bowl) since this title . It was their last postseason appearance until 1970, and their last postseason home game and victory until 1991. 

1991 was also the only time the Lions have advanced as far as the Conference Championship game, losing the NFC Championship Game 41–10 to the Washington Redskins, who went on to win Super Bowl XXVI.

Video 
YouTube – 1957 NFL Championship - Lions vs. Browns - Vol. 1
YouTube – 1957 NFL Championship - Lions vs. Browns - Vol. 2

References

Championship Game, 1957
National Football League Championship games
Cleveland Browns postseason
Detroit Lions postseason
NFL Championship
December 1957 sports events in the United States
1957 in Detroit
American football competitions in Detroit